Doston Yokubov (born 5 April 1995) is an Uzbek Olympic weightlifter. He won the gold medal in the men's 67 kg event at the 2021 World Weightlifting Championships held in Tashkent, Uzbekistan. He also represented his country at the 2016 Summer Olympics held in Rio de Janeiro, Brazil.

Major results

References 

1995 births
Living people
Uzbekistani male weightlifters
Weightlifters at the 2016 Summer Olympics
Olympic weightlifters of Uzbekistan
Weightlifters at the 2014 Asian Games
Weightlifters at the 2018 Asian Games
Asian Games medalists in weightlifting
Asian Games silver medalists for Uzbekistan
Medalists at the 2018 Asian Games
World Weightlifting Championships medalists
Islamic Solidarity Games competitors for Uzbekistan
Islamic Solidarity Games medalists in weightlifting
21st-century Uzbekistani people